Wittmackia burle-marxii is a species of flowering plant in the family Bromeliaceae, endemic  to Brazil (the states of Bahia and Minas Gerais). It was first described in 1979 as Aechmea burle-marxii.

References

Bromelioideae
Flora of Brazil
Plants described in 1979